Horace Holmes Thomas (December 18, 1831 – March 17, 1904) was a lawyer, Union Army officer, state legislator, and appraiser in Illinois who served in the Illinois House of Representatives and Illinois Senate. He was a Speaker of the Illinois House of Representatives from 1880 to 1881.

He was born in Hubbardton, Vermont, graduated from Middlebury College, and studied law. He moved to Chicago in 1859.

He was an officer in the Union Army during the American Civil War. He wrote about his Civil War experiences. He married and had a daughter. He was written about by the Grand Army Hall and Memorial Association of Illinois in 1904.

References

Union Army officers
Illinois state senators
Members of the Illinois House of Representatives
1831 births
1904 deaths
People from Hubbardton, Vermont
People of Tennessee in the American Civil War
Speakers of the Illinois House of Representatives
Middlebury College alumni
Politicians from Chicago